Gallium trichloride  is the chemical compound with the formula GaCl3.  Solid gallium trichloride exists as a dimer with the formula Ga2Cl6.  It is colourless and soluble in virtually all solvents, even alkanes, which is truly unusual for a metal halide.  It is the main precursor to most derivatives of gallium and a reagent in organic synthesis.

As a Lewis acid, GaCl3 is milder than aluminium trichloride.  Gallium(III) is easier to reduce than Al(III), so the chemistry of reduced gallium compounds is more extensive than for aluminium.  Ga2Cl4 is known whereas the corresponding Al2Cl4 is not.  The coordination chemistry of Ga(III) and Fe(III) are similar, and gallium(III) compounds have been used as diamagnetic analogues of ferric compounds.

Preparation
Gallium trichloride can be prepared from the elements, heating gallium metal in a stream of chlorine, and purifying the product by sublimation under vacuum.

2 Ga + 3 Cl2 → 2 GaCl3

It can also be prepared from by heating gallium oxide with thionyl chloride:
Ga2O3 + 3 SOCl2 → 2 GaCl3 + 3 SO2

Gallium metal reacts slowly with hydrochloric acid.  This reaction produces hydrogen gas slowly.

Structure
As a solid, it adopts a bitetrahedral structure with two bridging chlorides. Its structure resembles that of aluminium tribromide. In contrast AlCl3 and InCl3 feature contain 6 coordinate metal centers. As a consequence of its molecular nature and associated low lattice energy, gallium trichloride has a lower melting point vs the aluminium and indium trihalides. The formula of Ga2Cl6 is often written as Ga2(μ-Cl)2Cl4. In the gas phase the dimers dissociate to trigonal planar monomers.

Complexes
Gallium is the lightest member of Group 13 to have a full d shell, (gallium has the electronic configuration [Ar] 3d10 4s2 4p1) below the valence electrons that could take part in d-π bonding with ligands. 
The low oxidation state of Ga in Ga(III)Cl3, along with the low electronegativity and high polarisability, allow GaCl3 to behave as a "soft acid" in terms of the HSAB theory. The strength of the bonds between gallium halides and ligands have been extensively studied. What emerges is:
GaCl3 is a weaker Lewis acid than AlCl3 towards N and O donors e.g. pyridine
GaCl3 is a stronger Lewis acid than AlCl3 towards thioethers e.g. dimethyl sulfide, Me2S
With a chloride ion as ligand the tetrahedral GaCl4− ion is produced, the 6 coordinate GaCl63− cannot be made. Compounds like KGa2Cl7 that have a chloride bridged anion are known.
In  a molten mixture of KCl and GaCl3, the following equilibrium exists:
2 GaCl4−     Ga2Cl7− + Cl−

Uses

Organic synthesis 
Gallium trichloride is a Lewis acid catalyst, such as in the Friedel–Crafts reaction, and is also used in carbogallation reactions of compounds with a carbon-carbon triple bond. It is a precursor to organogallium reagents. It is also used as a catalyst in many organic reactions.

Detection of solar neutrinos 
110 tons of gallium trichloride aqueous solution was used in the GALLEX and GNO experiments performed at Laboratori Nazionali del Gran Sasso in Italy to detect solar neutrinos. In these experiments, germanium-71 was produced by neutrino interactions with the isotope gallium-71 (which has a natural abundance of 40%), and the subsequent beta decays of germanium-71 were measured.

See also
Gallium halides

References

External links
 

Inorganic compounds
Gallium compounds
Chlorides
Metal halides